A slider is an American term for a small sandwich, typically around 2 inches (5 cm) across, made with a bun. Sliders can be served as hors d'oeuvres, snacks, or entrées. They have since become a popular game day appetizer in the United States.

History 
"Slider" is believed to have been first used to describe the onion-steamed small burgers at White Castle restaurants. The term has since been picked up by other restaurants, usually to describe a small hamburger, but sometimes used to describe any small sandwich made with a slider bun. White Castle later trademarked the spelling variant "Slyder" and used it between 1985 and 2009.

Etymology 
The etymology of the term "slider" is uncertain. Food historian George Motz has cited two competing origin stories for the term: There are two stories about the history of the word 'slider,' both from White Castle. One is that they’re so small they slide down your throat—that’s the obvious choice. The other choice, which I like better, is that in the old days, White Castle was sort of like a show. You’d walk in and there would be two or three men behind the counter in white paper caps and clean white aprons on. They’d greet you when you came in, it was sort of a fun, happy environment. And if you were sitting at the counter, they would make your burger – everything was served on porcelain – and they would slide the burger down the counter to you. That’s how they became known as sliders. White Castle likes both stories; they haven’t picked a favorite.

See also 

 Burger King sliders
 Krystal
 List of hamburgers

References

External links
 

Sandwiches
Hamburgers (food)
White Castle (restaurant)
Appetizers